The Timm N2T Tutor is an American training monoplane built by the Timm Aircraft Corporation for the United States Navy as the N2T-1.

Design and development

The Timm S-160 (or Timm PT-160K) was a conventional tandem open-cockpit monoplane trainer first flown on the 22 May 1940 by test pilot Vance Breese. It was powered by a Kinner R-5 radial engine and was a low-wing cantilever monoplane with a tailwheel landing gear. It had an unusual feature in that the airframe structure was made from resin impregnated and molded plywood, creating a composite material stronger and lighter than plywood. This process was patented as the Nuyon process and marketed as the aeromold process. The S-160 received the first approval for a plastic-wood construction, (ATC #747), on 28 August  1941.

The PT-175-K variant was fitted with a Kinner R-53 engine. This was followed by the PT-220-C with a  220 hp (164 kW) Continental W-670-6 engine and larger tail.

Operational history
The PT-220C was evaluated by the United States Navy, which ordered 262 aircraft in 1943 as the N2T-1, incorporating only slight changes from the prototypes. The N2T-1 was a U.S. Navy basic trainer which the Navy nicknamed "Tiny Timm." The entire initial order was delivered in 1943 with no follow-on contract due to the military placing too many orders for Army and Navy trainers.

Postwar
Although popular and relatively reliable, the N2T-1 was not built for long-term use, especially being made almost entirely of a wood based composite material that proved to be susceptible to decomposing. Postwar, the N2T was sold to private owners and 10 remained on the U.S. civil aircraft register in 2001.

Variants
PT-160-K (ATC#747)
Version with a 160 hp (119 kW) Kinner R-5 engine.
PT-175-L 
Version with a 175 hp (130 kW) Kinner R-53 engine.
PT-220-C (ATC#750)
Version with a 220 hp (164 kW) Continental W-670-6 engine.
N2T-1
Production version of the PT-220C for the United States Navy, 262 built.

Operators

 United States Navy
 US private owners (postwar)

Surviving aircraft

N2Ts are preserved in U.S. museums, including examples at the National Museum of Naval Aviation at NAS Pensacola, Florida, and at the Air Zoo at Kalamazoo Municipal Airport, Michigan.

Accidents
An N2T-1, tail number N56308, crashed during the Rocky Mountain Airshow at the Flagler Airport, Flagler, Colorado, on 15 September 1951, killing the pilot and 19 spectators. The Mississippi director of aviation banned airshows in the state that year as a result.

Specifications (N2T-1)

See also

References

Notes

Bibliography
 Andrade, John. U.S.Military Aircraft Designations and Serials since 1909. Midland Counties Publications, 1979. .
 Bridgeman, Leonard. Jane's All the World's Aircraft. London: Sampson, Low, Marston & Co. Ltd, 1942.
 The Illustrated Encyclopedia of Aircraft (Part Work 1982-1985). London: Orbis Publishing, 1985. 
 Juptner, Joseph P. U.S. Civil Aircraft Series, Volume 8. New York: McGraw-Hill Professional, 1993. .
 Ogden, Bob. Aviation Museums and Collections of North America. Tonbridge, Kent, UK: Air-Britain (Historians) Ltd, 2007.  .
 Simpson, Rod. Airlife's World Aircraft. Shrewsbury, UK: Airlife Publishing Ltd, 2001. .

External links

 Plastic Airplanes Revolutionizes Aircraft Design August 1940 Popular Mechanics

N2T
1940s United States military trainer aircraft
Single-engined tractor aircraft
Low-wing aircraft
Aircraft first flown in 1940